Wingrove Austin Manners (7 March 1955 – 22 April 2014) was a Barbadian professional footballer who played as a forward.

Career
Manners joined Bradford City as an apprentice, moving to the first-team in January 1972. He made 1 league appearance for the club. He was released by the club in February 1973.

He later became a racketlon player, winning the Over-45s World Racketlon Tour Scottish Open title in October 2008.

Sources

References

1955 births
2014 deaths
Barbadian footballers
Bradford City A.F.C. players
English Football League players
Association football forwards
Barbadian expatriate footballers
Barbadian expatriates in England
Expatriate footballers in England
Racketlon players